Stephanie of Armenia (after 1195 – June 1220), also known as Rita, was a member of the Rubenid dynasty and claimant to the throne of the Armenian Kingdom of Cilicia.

Stephanie was the only child of Leo I, King of Armenia, by his first wife Isabelle. Stephanie's maternal family is disputed. It is believed that her mother was a niece of Sybille, wife of Bohemond III of Antioch. Others  believe that her mother was of Austrian and German origins. Stephanie was brought up by her paternal grandmother Rita of Barbaron. She was around ten years old when her mother died, who had not borne Leo any more children. Around 1210 Stephanie's father remarried to Sibylla, daughter of Isabella I of Jerusalem. From this marriage she gained a half-sister, Isabella.

In April 1214, Stephanie married John of Brienne. John had only recently lost his first wife Maria, Queen of Jerusalem, who was a sister of Stephanie's stepmother Sibylla. Stephanie was a bad stepmother to John's daughter, Queen Isabella II of Jerusalem, on whose behalf John ruled Jerusalem as regent. Stephanie herself gave birth in 1216 to a son named John.

In May, 1219 Stephanie's father died. He had made the barons swear an oath of allegiance to his great-nephew Raymond-Roupen, who became his heir. However, on his death bed King Leo changed the succession. He made his daughter Isabelle  his heir and released the barons from their oath of allegiance. Stephanie was still alive at the time and would have had more right because she was the older daughter. Also, Stephanie had a son. Stephanie's husband, John pressed the claim on behalf of his wife. Raymond-Roupen also pressed his claim on the throne.

John left the Fifth Crusade in February 1220 intending to visit Cilicia to press his family's claim. In June, however, Stephanie died; it was gossiped that John had beaten her to death after she tried to poison her stepdaughter, Isabella. Stephanie's young son died shortly afterwards. John of Brienne had no longer a claim on the throne of Cilicia.

References

Sources 

Rubenid dynasty
Pretenders
Year of birth uncertain
1220 deaths
Armenian princesses
12th-century Armenian people
12th-century Armenian women
13th-century Armenian people
13th-century Armenian women